Dada Darbar is a Hindu Temple in Khandwa, Nimar region, Madhya Pradesh, India. It is named after Dadaji Dhuniwale.

Dada Darbar is built at the memorial place of Dadaji Dhuniwale. There are innumerable devotees of ‘Dadaji’ in India. There are twenty-seven Dham's in India and abroad in the name of Dadaji Dhuniwale.

External links
 "Shri Shri 1008 Shri Dadaji Dhuniwaley" at Shri Shri 1008 Shri Dada Darbar
 Tourism at Khandwa

Buildings and structures in Madhya Pradesh
Hindu temples in Madhya Pradesh
Khandwa district